This is a list of airports in Alaska (a U.S. state), grouped by type and sorted by location. It contains all public-use and military airports in the state. Some private-use and former airports may be included where notable, such as airports that were previously public-use, those with commercial enplanements recorded by the FAA or airports assigned an IATA airport code. Due to the small population combined with the large area of the state, much of which is wilderness, most of Alaska is both uninhabited and almost entirely undeveloped. This leads to many towns with no roads leading to them, which are only accessible by airplane (although many coastal villages are also accessible by ship, they nonetheless do not contain any roads accessible by the rest of North America). Because of this, virtually every town in Alaska has an airport. This leads to Alaska having by far the most airports in the country per capita, containing roughly 1 out of every 400 Americans but nearly 1 out of every 50 airports.

Airports

Footnotes:

See also 
 List of airlines in Alaska
 List of airports by ICAO code: P#PA PF PO PP - Alaska
 Wikipedia: WikiProject Aviation/Airline destination lists: North America#Alaska

References

Sources 
Federal Aviation Administration (FAA):
 FAA Airport Data (Form 5010) from National Flight Data Center (NFDC), also available from AirportIQ 5010
 National Plan of Integrated Airport Systems (2021–2025), released 2021
 Passenger Boarding (Enplanement) Data for CY 2019 and 2020, Updated November 8, 2021

 FAA Order JO 7350.8U – Location Identifiers, effective September 20, 2012
 Alaskan Region Airports Division
 Alaska Flight Services Information Area Group
 FAI FSS – Airport Photographs

Alaska Department of Transportation & Public Facilities (DOT&PF):
 DOT&PF Aviation & Airports
 Public Airports in Alaska
 

Other sites used as a reference when compiling and updating this list:
  – used to check IATA airport codes 
 Aviation Safety Network – used to check IATA airport codes
 AirNav.com: Airports in Alaska – used to check ICAO airport codes
 Great Circle Mapper: Airports in Alaska – used to check IATA and ICAO airport codes
 Abandoned & Little-Known Airfields: Alaska – used for information on former airports

 
Alaska
Airports
Airports